The 1978–79 season was Nottingham Forest's second year back in the Football League First Division. They had won the title the previous season. This meant they qualified for the first time in their history for the European Cup.

Summary

Forest opened the defence of their title with six draws in their first seven league matches. On 7 September the 2–1 win at Aston Villa broke the previous undefeated record of 34 consecutive league games by Don Revie' Leeds United in the 1968–69 season. On 28 November the 1–0 win at Bolton set an undefeated record of 42 consecutive league games. The record stood for twenty six years. Garry Birtles broke into the first team and ended up being the club's top scorer as they ended up as league runners-up, retained the League Cup and won the European Cup. Along the way they knocked out holders Liverpool and came from behind to oust West German champions Cologne. Trevor Francis became the first £1,000,000 player when he signed for the Reds from Birmingham City and immediately proved his worth by scoring the only goal of the European Cup final against Malmö in Munich. 26 year old Colin Barrett suffered a serious leg injury 10 days after scoring in the win against Liverpool. He only played seven further competitive games for Forest and 12 in his career.

Players

Squad Stats

The statistics for the following players are for their time during 1978–79 season playing for Nottingham Forest. Any stats from a different club during 1978–79 are not included. Includes all competitive matches.

Top scorers

Includes all competitive matches. The list is sorted by league goals when total goals are equal.

Last updated on 11 May 2010

Transfers In

Transfers Out

Club Kit

|
|

Competitions

Division One

Results by round

Matches

Competitive

Football League First Division

Last updated: 28 August 2011Source: Bridport Red Archive

League Cup

Last updated: 28 August 2011Source: Bridport Red Archive

FA Cup

Last updated: 28 August 2011Source: Bridport Red Archive

FA Charity Shield

Last updated: 28 August 2011Source: Bridport Red Archive

European Cup

First round

Second round

Quarter-final

Semi-final

Final

Last updated: 28 August 2011Source: Bridport Red Archive

Pre-season and Friendlies

Last updated: 28 August 2011Source: The City Ground

References

Nottingham Forest F.C. seasons
Nottingham Forest F.C.
UEFA Champions League-winning seasons